Franco José Del Giglio Grossi (born 7 January 1993) is an Argentine professional footballer who most recently played as a midfielder for Atlético Vega Real.

Career
Before the 2015 season, Del Giglio signed for Colombian top flight side Cúcuta Deportivo, where he made ten appearances and scored two goals. On 15 February 2015, he debuted for Cúcuta Deportivo during a 3–0 loss to Millonarios.

On 18 February 2015, Del Giglio scored his first goal for Cúcuta Deportivo during a 5–1 win over Real Santander. In 2016, he signed for Argentino (Rosario) in the Argentine fifth division. Before the second half of 2016–17, Del Giglio signed for Austrian third division club ATSV Wolfsberg. In 2017, he signed for NTSV Strand 08 in the German fifth division. Before the 2018 season, he signed for Chilean second division team Coquimbo Unido.

In 2018, Del Giglio signed for Central Córdoba (Rosario) in the Argentine fourth division. In 2019, he signed for Italian team Monticelli. Before the 2020 season, he signed for Atlético Vega Real in the Dominican Republic.

References

External links
 
 

Living people
1993 births
Argentine footballers
Footballers from Rosario, Santa Fe
Association football midfielders
Categoría Primera A players
Primera B de Chile players
Austrian Regionalliga players
Eccellenza players
Argentine people of Italian descent
Cúcuta Deportivo footballers
Coquimbo Unido footballers
Liga Dominicana de Fútbol players
Atlético Vega Real players
Argentine expatriate footballers
Argentine expatriate sportspeople in Colombia
Expatriate footballers in Colombia
Argentine expatriate sportspeople in Chile
Expatriate footballers in Chile
Argentine expatriate sportspeople in Italy
Expatriate footballers in Italy
Argentine expatriate sportspeople in Austria
Expatriate footballers in Austria
Argentine expatriate sportspeople in Germany
Expatriate footballers in Germany
Argentine expatriate sportspeople in the Dominican Republic
Expatriate footballers in the Dominican Republic